The Archery Hall of Fame and Museum is located in Springfield, Missouri on the upper floor of Bass Pro Shop Outdoor World.

History
It was formed in 1971 as a committee of the American Archery Council.

Inductees

1972
 Fred Bear
 Howard Hill
 Ann Weber Hoyt
 Karl E. Palmatier
 Ben Pearson
 Maurice Thompson
 Russ Hoogerhyde

1973
 Robert P. Elmer
 Russ Saxton Pope
 Rube Powell
 Clayton B. Shenk
 Art Young (archery)

1974
 Dorothy Smith Cummings
 Harry Eugene Drake
 Doug Easton
 John Yount (archery)

1975
 Paul Crouch (archery)
 Matilda Howell
 Jean Lee Lombardo

1976
 Babe Bitzenberger
 Dr. Paul Klopsteg
 Louis Carter Smith

1977
 Clarence N. Hickman
 Earl Hoyt Jr. (Obituary)
 Myrtle Miller

1978
 Roy Hoff
 Ann Marston
 Homer Taylor

1979
 Will H. Thompson
 Lura R. Wilson

1980
 Florence Lillie
 George Helwig

1982
 Al Henderson (archery)

1984
 Ann Clark (archery)

1985
 Robert Rhode
 C. A. Saunders

1986
 Henry Bitzenberger
 Doreen Wilber

1988
 Roy Case

1991
 Glenn St. Charles

1997
 Jim Dougherty
 Jim Easton
 Bob Kelly
 Frank Scott

1998
 William Bill Wadsworth

1999
 Floyd Eccleston
 Tom Jennings
 Dick Lattimer

2000
 Stacy Groscup
 Bob Swinehart

2001
 Larry C. Whiffen

2002
 Norbert Norb Mullaney

2003
 Allan Martin (archery)
 M. R. James (archery)

2004
 Rollin Bohning

2005
 Charles E. "Bert" Grayson
 Len Cardinale

2006
 Ed Rohde

2007
 William Bednar
 David Samuel (archery)
 Ishi

2008
 Chuck Adams (archery)
 Julia Body
 George Gardner (archery)
 Dave Staples

2010
 Will Compton
 Hollis Wilbur Allen
 Frank Gandy
 G. Fred Asbell

2011
 Gail Martin
 Ann Butz
 Victoria Cook

2012
 Bob Lee

2013
 Aldo Leopold
 Victor Berger

2014
 Clarence "Bud" Fowkes
 Margaret Klann

2015
 Darrell Pace 
 Randy Ulmer 
 John Williams   
 Jack Witt

2016
 Owen Jeffery
 Dick Mauch 

2017
 Michelle Ragsdale 
 Terry Ragsdale 

2018
 Richard Carella
 Bob Markworth  
 Pete Shepley  

2019
 Robert Eastman
 Dwight Schuh
 The Wilson Boys

References

Halls of fame in Missouri
Sports halls of fame
Awards established in 1971
1971 establishments in Missouri
Archery organizations
Museums in Springfield, Missouri
Sports museums in Missouri
Hall